George is a surname of Irish, English, Welsh, South Indian Christian, Middle Eastern Christian (usually Lebanese), French, or Native American origin. The German form is Georg. Notable people with the surname include:

Allan George (born 1999), American football player
Alex or Alexander George (disambiguation)
Anju Bobby George, (born 1977), Indian athlete
Arthur George (1915–2013), Australian lawyer and soccer administrator
Augustus George (1817–1902), English cricketer
Barry George (born 1960), British man who was wrongly convicted of murder
Bill or Billy George, see William George (disambiguation)
Bobby George (born 1945),  English darts player and presenter
Brian George (born 1952),  Israeli-born British actor
Bud George (1927–2017), American politician
Cathy George, American volleyball coach
Charlie George (born 1950), English footballer
Charlie George (comedian), (fl. 2020's) British comedian
Christopher George (1931–1983),  Greek-American television and film actor
Chief Dan George (1899–1981), chief of the Tsleil-Waututh Nation, author, poet and actor
Daniel George (rugby union) (born 1986), Welsh rugby player
Daniel G. George (1840–1916), Union Navy sailor and Medal of Honor recipient
Darryl George (born 1993), Australian baseball player
David George (disambiguation)
Devean George (born 1977), American  basketball player
Eddie George (born 1973), American football player
Eden George (1863–1927), Mayor of Christchurch and member of the New South Wales Legislative Assembly
Edward George, Baron George (1938–2009), British banker
Elizabeth George (born 1949), American novelist
Ella George, Australian politician
Ella M. George (1850-1938), American teacher, lecturer, social reformer
Elmer George (1928–1976), American race car driver
Elva A. George (c.1876–1953), American dietitian
Emma George (born 1974), Australian athlete
Enderson George (born 1982), international soccer player from Saint Lucia
Esmond George (1888–1959), South Australian theatre director, watercolor artist and art critic
Finidi George (born 1971), Nigerian soccer player
Francis George (1937–2015), American  Archbishop and Cardinal 
Frank Honywill George (1921–1997), British psychologist and cyberneticist 
Fricson George (born 1974), Ecuadorian association football player
Gabrielle George (born 1997), English association footballer
Genevieve George (1927–2002), Canadian baseball player
Gladys George (1904–1954), American actress
Götz George (1938–2016), German actor
Grover C. George (1893-1976), American farmer and politician
Gwyneth George (1920–2016), British concert cellist
Harry L. George (1849–1923), American collector of Native American artifacts
Heather George (1907–1983), Australian commercial photographer
Heinrich George (1893–1946), German stage and film actor
Helen Margaret George (1883–1982), British artist and sculptor
Henry George (disambiguation)
Inara George (born 1974), American singer-songwriter
Jack George (1928–1989), American basketball player
James Z. George (1826–1897), US Senator from Mississippi
Katie George (cosplayer) (born 1988), American cosplayer
Katie George (cricketer) (born 1999), English cricketer
Katie George (sportscaster) (born 1993), American sportscaster
Linda George (Australian singer) (born 1951), English-born Australian pop singer
Linda George (Assyrian singer), Assyrian-American pop singer popular in the 1980s–2010s
Linda K. George (born 1947), American sociologist and gerontologist
Lynda Day George, American television actress popular in the 1960s and 1970s
Leroy George, Dutch footballer
Louis George (disambiguation)
Lynda Day George (born 1944), American TV and film actress 
Lowell George (1945–1979), American singer-songwriter and producer
Lloyd D. George (1930–2020), United States District Judge
Lloyd R. George (1925–2012), American politician
Madeline Rees George (1851–1931), South Australian educator
Manfred George (1893–1965), born Manfred Georg Cohn, German emigrant journalist, author and translator
Marie George (1877–1974), actress and singer
Mary Dorothy George (1878–1971), British historian and compiler of the BM Satires
Maryanne J. George, American Christian musician
Margaret George (born 1943), American historical novelist
Max A. George (born 1988), British singer-songwriter
Mechthild Georg, German mezzo-soprano
Melissa George (born 1976), Australian actress
Melvin Clark George (1849–1933), American politician
Michael J. George (1948-2010), American politician
Myron Virgil George (1900–1972), American politician
Nelson George (born 1957), African American author, culture critic and filmmaker
Newell A. George (1904–1992), American politician
Noel George (1897–1929), football goalkeeper of the 1920s
Norman George (born 1946), Cook Islands politician
Oorlagh George (born 1980), American filmmaker from Northern Ireland
Paul George (born 1990), American basketball player
Paul George (disambiguation)
Pete George (1929–2021), American weightlifter and Olympic champion
Peter George (disambiguation) 
Phyllis George (1949–2020), Miss America, sportscaster
Robert George (disambiguation), multiple people
Sophia George (born 1964), Jamaican singer
Stefan George (1868–1933), German poet
Susan George (actress) (born 1950), English film and television actress
Susan George (political scientist) (born 1934), Franco-American political and social scientist
Susan Elizabeth George (born 1949), author
Terry George (born 1952), Irish screenwriter and director
Thomas George (disambiguation)
Tom George  (born 1956), American politician
Tony George (born 1959), CEO of the Indianapolis Motor Speedway Co.
Tyler George (born 1982), American curler 
Uwe George (born 1940), German documentary film maker and writer
Vanessa George (born 1970), English paedophile convicted in the 2009 Plymouth child abuse case
W. L. George (1882–1926), English writer
Wally George (1931–2003), American conservative radio and television commentator
Walter George (disambiguation)
William George (disambiguation)

See also
 Lloyd George (disambiguation), including people with the surname Lloyd George
 George (given name)
 George (disambiguation)
 Gorgeous George (disambiguation)
 Georgiev
 Georgievski

References 

English-language surnames
French-language surnames
Surnames from given names